Jan Huruk (born 27 October 1960 in Orsk) is a retired Polish long-distance runner who specialized in the marathon.

Achievements

Personal bests
10,000 metres - 28:18.42 minutes (1989)
Marathon - 2:10.07 hours (1992)

References
sports-reference

1960 births
Living people
Polish male long-distance runners
Athletes (track and field) at the 1992 Summer Olympics
Olympic athletes of Poland
People from Lubin County
Sportspeople from Lower Silesian Voivodeship
Polish male marathon runners